Following is a list of football clubs located in Sint Maarten, sorted alphabetically.

D&P Connection FC
Flames United SC
Funmakers FC
Haitian United
Hot Spurs
Jah Rebels
Liberation Stars
Lucian United
Organized Youth
Reggae Lions
RISC Takers FC
FC Soualiga
United Super Stars FC
United Warlords
Veendam FC
Victory Boys
Young Strikers FC

Sint Maarten
 

Football clubs